Aimilios Papathanasiou (born 8 May 1973) is a Greek sailor. He competed in the Finn class at the 1996, 2000, 2004, 2008 and 2012 Summer Olympics. His best Olympic result is fifth place in Athens in 2004.

References

External links
 
 
 

1973 births
Living people
Greek male sailors (sport)
Olympic sailors of Greece
Sailors at the 1996 Summer Olympics – Finn
Sailors at the 2000 Summer Olympics – Finn
Sailors at the 2004 Summer Olympics – Finn
Sailors at the 2008 Summer Olympics – Finn
Sailors at the 2012 Summer Olympics – Star
Sailors (sport) from Athens